Gdata may refer to:

GData, the Google Data Protocol
G Data CyberDefense, an software company